Oshdalaq in Bostanabad County, also rendered as Oshtolaq or Oshdalaq or Oshtelaghe or Oshtelaq or Ashdalaq and also known as Ushdeli or Oshtoq or Ushtulia or Ushtulya, may refer to:
 Oshdalaq-e Olya
 Oshdalaq-e Sofla